Luis Antonio Moreno Huila (born December 25, 1970 in Jamundi) is a retired Colombian footballer, who played for a number of clubs, including América de Cali and Deportes Tolima.

He played for the Colombia national football team and was a participant at the 1998 FIFA World Cup.

References

 Profile

1970 births
Living people
Colombian footballers
Categoría Primera A players
Deportes Tolima footballers
América de Cali footballers
Colombia international footballers
1998 FIFA World Cup players
1997 Copa América players
Association football defenders
Sportspeople from Valle del Cauca Department